Super Hits is a 2000 compilation album by American singer Frank Sinatra.

Track listing
"Begin the Beguine" (Cole Porter)
"Nancy (With the Laughing Face)" (Phil Silvers, Jimmy Van Heusen)
"The Coffee Song (They've Got An Awful Lot of Coffee In Brazil)" (Bob Hilliard, Dick Miles)
"One for My Baby (and One More for the Road)" (Harold Arlen, Johnny Mercer)
"Dream (When You're Feeling Blue)" (Mercer)
"Saturday Night (Is the Loneliest Night of the Week)" (Sammy Cahn, Jule Styne)
"Home on the Range" (Brewster M. Higley, Daniel E. Kelley)
"Nature Boy" (Eden Ahbez)
"Sunshine Cake" (Johnny Burke, Van Heusen)
"Castle Rock" [Single Version] (Ervin Drake, Al Sears, J. Shirl)

Personnel
 Frank Sinatra - vocals
 Paula Kelly
 Harry James - trumpet
 Axel Stordahl - arranger, conductor

References

2000 compilation albums
Frank Sinatra compilation albums
Compilation albums published posthumously